Näsåker is a locality situated in Sollefteå Municipality, Västernorrland County, Sweden with 513 inhabitants in 2010.

References 

Populated places in Sollefteå Municipality
Ångermanland